Ardlui railway station is a rural railway station, serving Ardlui at the north end of Loch Lomond, in Scotland. The station is located on the West Highland Line, sited  from Craigendoran Junction, near Helensburgh, between Crianlarich and Arrochar and Tarbet. ScotRail manage the station and operate most services, others provided by Caledonian Sleeper.

History 

Opened to passengers on 7 August 1894 by the West Highland Railway, then run by the North British Railway, it became part of the London and North Eastern Railway during the Grouping of 1923. The station was host to a LNER camping coach from 1935 to 1939 and possibly one for some of 1934. The station then passed on to the Scottish Region of British Railways on nationalisation in 1948. A camping coach was also positioned here from 1964 to 1966. Due to subsidence the main station building, of the standard 'West Highland' design, had to be demolished around 1970 with an open waiting area built on to the signal box.

Between 1945 and 1948 a station and passing loop were located to the west of Ardlui at Inveruglas which served the passenger and freight requirements of the Sloy hydroelectric scheme.

Facilities 
The station has an island platform, equipped with a shelter and a waiting room, benches, bike racks and a help point. The only entrance to the station is directly off the A82, so there is no step free access. As there are no facilities to purchase tickets, passengers must buy one in advance, or from the guard on the train.

Passenger volume 

The statistics cover twelve month periods that start in April.

Services 
Monday to Saturday, there are six services to Oban and three to Mallaig (the latter combined with Oban portions, dividing at ), and one service to Fort William (the Highland Caledonian Sleeper, weekday mornings only) northbound. Southbound, there are six services to Glasgow Queen Street High Level and one service to London Euston via Queen Street Low Level & Edinburgh Waverley (the Highland Caledonian Sleeper - does not run on Saturday).

On Sundays, there are two trains northbound to Mallaig, the Caledonian Sleeper to Fort William and one extra to Oban only, plus an extra summer service to Oban; Southbound there are three trains southbound to Glasgow Queen Street. In summer months, the extra summer Sunday service returns to Edinburgh, avoiding Glasgow.

References

Bibliography

External links

 Station on navigable O.S. map.
 RAILSCOT on the West Highland Railway
 Video footage of Ardlui railway station

Railway stations in Argyll and Bute
Former North British Railway stations
Railway stations in Great Britain opened in 1894
Railway stations served by ScotRail
Railway stations served by Caledonian Sleeper
James Miller railway stations
Listed railway stations in Scotland
Category C listed buildings in Argyll and Bute